Walter Clarke may refer to:

 Walter Clarke (linguist), Manx Gaelic speaker who undertook to record the surviving native Manx speakers
 Walter Clarke (governor) (1640–1714), Governor of the Colony of Rhode Island and Providence Plantations
 Walter Clarke (footballer) (1883–1939), Australian rules footballer
Walter Clarke of Joe Thompson vs Walter Clarke

See also 
 Walter Clark (disambiguation)